Dame Frances Clare Kirwan,  (born 21 August 1959) is a British mathematician, currently Savilian Professor of Geometry at the University of Oxford. Her fields of specialisation are algebraic and symplectic geometry.

Education
Kirwan was educated at Oxford High School, and studied maths as an undergraduate at Clare College in the University of Cambridge. She took a D.Phil at Oxford in 1984, with the dissertation title The Cohomology of Quotients in Symplectic and Algebraic Geometry, which was supervised by Michael Atiyah.

Research
Kirwan's research interests include moduli spaces in algebraic geometry, geometric invariant theory (GIT), and in the link between GIT and moment maps in symplectic geometry. Her work endeavours to understand the structure of geometric objects by investigation of their algebraic and topological properties. She introduced the Kirwan map. 

From 1983 to 1985 she held a junior fellowship at Harvard. From 1983 to 1986 she held a Fellowship at Magdalen College, Oxford, before becoming a Fellow of Balliol College, Oxford. She is an honorary fellow of Clare College, Cambridge and also at Magdalen College.

In 1996, she was awarded the Title of Distinction of Professor of Mathematics. From 2004 to 2006 she was president of the London Mathematical Society, the second-youngest president in the society's history and only the second woman to be president. In 2005, she received a five-year EPSRC Senior Research Fellowship, to support her research on the moduli spaces of complex algebraic curves.

In 2017, she was elected Savilian Professor of Geometry, becoming the first woman to hold the post. While this entailed a move to New College, Oxford she was elected an emeritus fellow at Balliol. She was the convenor of the 2008–9 meeting of European Women in Mathematics and deputy convenor of the following meeting in 2010–11.

Prizes, awards and scholarships
 London Mathematical Society Whitehead Prize, 1989
 Fellow of the Royal Society, 2001
 President, London Mathematical Society, 2003–2005
 EPSRC Senior Research Fellowship, 2005–2010, for her work in algebraic geometry
 Fellow of the American Mathematical Society, 2012
 London Mathematical Society Senior Whitehead Prize, 2013 
 DBE for services to mathematics, 2014
Maths and Computing Suffrage Science award, 2016
 Member of Academia Europaea
 Chairman of the United Kingdom Mathematics Trust
 Sylvester Medal of The Royal Society, 2021
 Honorary degree, University of York, 2020
 Honorary degree, University of St Andrews, 2022

Kirwan served on the medal-selection committee that awarded the Fields medal to Maryam Mirzakhani.

Publications

 with Jonathan Woolf:

References

External links 
 Profile at the University of Oxford Mathematical Institute

1959 births
Living people
Place of birth missing (living people)
20th-century British mathematicians
21st-century British mathematicians
Algebraic geometers
British women mathematicians
Alumni of Clare College, Cambridge
Fellows of Clare College, Cambridge
Alumni of the University of Oxford
Fellows of Balliol College, Oxford
Fellows of Magdalen College, Oxford
Fellows of New College, Oxford
Female Fellows of the Royal Society
Fellows of the American Mathematical Society
Members of Academia Europaea
Harvard Fellows
People educated at Oxford High School, England
Whitehead Prize winners
British women academics
Fellows of the Royal Society
Dames Commander of the Order of the British Empire
20th-century women mathematicians
21st-century women mathematicians